Bir, or Bir,(بیڑ) is one of the 44 union councils, administrative subdivisions, of Haripur District in the Khyber Pakhtunkhwa province of Pakistan. 

The village of Chaintri is part of Bir.

References

Union councils of Haripur District